Jean Joseph Vaudechamp (1790–1866) was a French painter born in Rambervillers, Vosges. He was a pupil of Anne-Louis Girodet de Roussy-Trioson.

New Orleans

The market in Paris was competitive, so in the winter of 1831–32, he went to try his fortunes in New Orleans, Louisiana. The Louisiana Creole people identified with French culture and selected Vaudechamp to paint portraits for them. Over the next ten years he spent winters in New Orleans, and was a leading portrait painter in the region. He died at Neuilly-sur-Seine in 1866.

References

External links

Louisiana State Museum

1790 births
1866 deaths
People from Lorraine
19th-century French painters
French male painters
French portrait painters
19th-century French male artists